The Reckoning: The Battle for the International Criminal Court is a 2009 documentary film about the International Criminal Court produced by Skylight Pictures and directed by Pamela Yates. It was nominated for the Grand Jury Prize at the Sundance Film Festival and won Best Documentary at the Politics on Film Festival.

The film aired on POV on July 14, 2009.

External links
 
 Official website of Skylight Pictures
International Justice Central homepage

2009 documentary films
2009 films
American documentary films
Documentary films about law
Works about the International Criminal Court
2000s American films